Birr Airfield is located  south of the town of Birr in County Offaly in Ireland. It was originally called Birr View Air Strip. The area for many years has been closely linked with aviation, dating from the time of the British Army air strip which was very near the present air field.

The Ormand Flying Club has been in operation at Birr Airfield for over 30 years. The club is a Registered Training Facility for the new JAR PPL Licence. The airfield has one landing strip which is orientated north/south. Recent construction of a hangar allows overnight storage of aircraft with avgas and mogas facilities on site.

Open to the public, however prior permission is required.

References

External links

 Ormand Flying Club

Airports in the Republic of Ireland
Buildings and structures in Birr, County Offaly
Transport in County Offaly